Roman Schaad (born 30 July 1993 in Oberhallau) is a Swiss cross-country skier.

Schaad competed at the 2014 Winter Olympics for Switzerland. He placed 83rd in the qualifying round in the sprint, failing to advance to the knockout stages.

Schaad made his World Cup debut in December 2013. As of April 2014, his best finish is a 9th, in a freestyle sprint event at Toblach in 2013–14. His best World Cup overall finish is 79th, in 2013-14. His best World Cup finish in a discipline is 34th, in the 2013-14 sprint.

Cross-country skiing results
All results are sourced from the International Ski Federation (FIS).

Olympic Games

Distance reduced to 30 km due to weather conditions.

World Championships

World Cup

Season standings

References

External links

1993 births
Living people
Olympic cross-country skiers of Switzerland
Cross-country skiers at the 2014 Winter Olympics
Cross-country skiers at the 2022 Winter Olympics
People from Schaffhausen
Sportspeople from the canton of Schaffhausen
Swiss male cross-country skiers